The Charles XII Bible was a Bible translation into Swedish, instigated by King Charles XI in 1686 to produce an updated and modernised version of the old translation from 1541, which was known as the Gustav Vasa Bible. Charles XI died before the work was finished, and the new Bible translation was named for his son, King Charles XII. The translation was completed in 1703.

Previously, in 1618, during the reign of Gustav II Adolf, a revised version of the Gustav Vasa Bible had been published; the Charles XII Bible is a modernised version of this Bible, including corrections and revised spellings.

References

Further reading
Åberg, Alf. 1958. Karl XI. Wahlström & Widstrand (reprinted by ScandBook, Falun 1994)
Bengtsson B. 1953. Tillkomsten av Carl XII:s Biblia. Stockholm: Lagerströms förlag.
"Charles XII Bible." Encyclopædia Britannica.
Rystad, Göran. 2001 Karl XI / En biografi. Falun: AiT Falun AB.

External links
 

 

1703 books
Bible translations into Swedish
Swedish books
1703 in Christianity